A parent–teacher association/organization (PTA/PTO), parent-teacher-friend association (PTFA), or parent–teacher–student association (PTSA) is a formal organization composed of parents, teachers and staff that is intended to facilitate parental participation in a school.

Australia and New Zealand
In Australia, the function of PTAs is filled by parents and citizens associations, which are governed by both state and national organisational bodies.

India

National Policy on Education, 1986, India 
A 1992, "Program on Action" for the 1986 National Policy on Education encouraged 'giving pre-eminence to people's involvement including association of non-governmental and voluntary effort'.

Government schemes 
Government education schemes such as Rashtriya Madhyamik Shiksha Abhiyan (RMSA) and Sarva Shiksha Abhiyan (SSA) have advocated community mobilisation and involvement. Under RMSA every school should have a PTA. School Development Management Committees (SDMCs) should co-exist with PTAs and leverage their functions. PTAs which should conduct meetings at least once a month and present SDMCs with a register of complaints, suggestions and actions taken. In 2013–14 37.54% of the schools in India had a PTA. A 2010 study suggested that 50% of parents in rural areas and 45% in urban areas were aware of the existence of school PTAs.

State guidelines

Maharashtra 
In 1996, the Maharashtra government declared PTAs mandatory in all schools within the state. By 2014 50% of the schools had a PTA.
State guidelines for PTAs included:
 The parents of every student shall be members of a PTA 
 The PTA does not interfere in the day-to-day administration of the schools
 50% of PTA members should be women
 Duties of the PTA committee should involve assisting the school in planning and organising educational programs, seeing the syllabus is completed, to collect and present information regarding school fees

Delhi 
The government of Delhi made PTAs mandatory in government-aided and private unaided schools. All parents are members of the PTA. PTA elections should be every other year and the PTA should hold a general meeting at least once a year. 78.21% of the schools in Delhi have a PTA.

Madhya Pradesh 
Decentralisation of school management was promoted though the setting up of PTAs under SSA. A 2016 government report stated that 25% of parents were aware of the existence of PTAs, 43% of the schools had PTAs and 39% of PTAs met regularly.

Tamil Nadu 
Tamil Nadu government policy includes the demand that PTAs should work towards pupil enrollment and attendance and assist in enhancing the quality of teaching and learning.

PTAs in India 
A 2020 survey of parents of schoolchildren for the government of India reported that 50% of respondents were aware of PTAs or MTAs (Mother Teacher Associations) and 16% were members.

United Arab Emirates
There are plans to organize a PTA in the United Arab Emirates at governmental schools such as ATHS (Applied Technology High School). They are present in the United States, the United Kingdom, and Japan.

United Kingdom
In the United Kingdom, parent-teacher associations are common, being present in the majority of schools (sometimes called home school associations). A 2007 NFER study found that 83 per cent of primary schools in England and Wales and 60 per cent of secondary schools had a "PTA or equivalent".

In England, Wales and Northern Ireland PTAs may choose to join Parentkind which describes itself as "The national charity representing over 13,750 PTAs across England, Wales and Northern Ireland" which seeks "To advance education by encouraging the fullest co-operation between home and school, education authorities, central government and all other interested parties and bodies." Unlike the USA the fact that a body is called a PTA does not, in itself, imply membership of any national organisation. There is a separate, similar body for Scotland, "The Scottish Parent Teacher Council".

PTAs are, in general not involved in the management of schools, that is a matter for the school governing bodies, but in practice parents who are active in the PTA will tend to engage in the elections of parent representatives (parent governors).

Japan

History

When the modern school system was introduced to Japan during the Meiji period (1868~1912), the cost of establishing and maintaining each school was considered to be mainly borne by town and village expenses, but school budgets were not necessarily abundant.  Therefore, in order to reduce the financial and labor burden on school management, many voluntary groups such as Parents Association and Mothers' Association were formed by parents of children and students attending school and residents of school districts.

Since the Showa 10's (1935~), due to the intensification of the war and the subsequent confusion, the group activities have stagnated temporarily.  However, after the end of the war, the activities started again, and activities and movements that tried to anticipate the spirit of the later PTA were also attempted in various places.

In the spring of Showa 21 (1946), the Supreme Commander for the Allied Powers announced the Report of the United States Education Mission to Japan. In the report, ideas that extend to the PTA were presented.

In October Showa 27 (1952), the Japan Parents and Teachers National Association Formation Conference was held in Tokyo, and the Japan PTA National Assembly was formed.

United States

PTA

In the U.S., groups which use the PTA initialism are part of the National Parent Teacher Association (National PTA), a non-profit organization based in Alexandria, Virginia. It is the largest and oldest volunteer organization working exclusively on behalf of children and youth.

Most public and private elementary and middle schools have either a PTA (public schools only), a parent–teacher organization (PTO) or an equivalent local organization. These organizations also exist (though less frequently) at high schools and preschools. Every person who joins a local PTA automatically becomes a member of both the state's PTA and National PTA. PTA membership – including the number of affiliated units and of individual members – has been declining for several decades.

Today, there are 54 PTA congresses: U.S. states, the District of Columbia, the U.S. Virgin Islands, Puerto Rico and Europe (military families, through the U.S. Department of Defense). There are 23,000 local organizations recognized by the National PTA in the United States.

Programs
 The Reflections Arts in Education Program encourages students to explore the arts and express themselves by giving positive recognition for their artistic efforts. Since it was founded in 1969 by Mary Lou Anderson, millions of students have benefited from this program. Through the Reflections Awards Program, your PTA can play a role in providing a positive learning environment for students that fosters self-exploration, encourages creative thinking and problem-solving, and promotes the exploration of arts and culture in the home, school and community. Any active PTA/PTSA in good standing is eligible to implement a Reflections Program.

Early history
The National Parent Teacher Association was founded on 17 February 1897, in Washington, D.C., as the National Congress of Mothers by Alice McLellan Birney and Phoebe Apperson Hearst at a meeting of over 2,000 parents, teachers, workers, and legislators. In 1908, the organization changed its name to the National Congress of Mothers and Parent-Teacher Associations..

Alice Birney's original vision and Phoebe Hearst's (wife of California U.S. Senator George Hearst and mother of publisher William Randolph Hearst) social and financial assistance came together in a burst of synergy that drew 2,000 people from across the country to discuss the issues affecting their children at the three-day event. The National Congress of Mothers quickly fanned out into a grassroots organization at national, state and local levels.

History highlights
 In 1908, the organization delegates voted to change its name to the National Congress of Mothers and Parent-Teacher Associations.
 In 1910, charter and board member, Mary Grinnell Mears, moved that "Founders Day be observed every February 17th of the year…"
 In 1925 the association adopted the name the National Congress of Parents and Teachers.
 In 1926, National PTA President Mrs. A. H. Reeve helped set up the National Congress of Colored Parents and Teachers to function in the District of Columbia and states where separate schools for the races were maintained, so that African-American children might have PTA service. On 7 May, the National Congress of Colored Parents and Teachers was formed.
 In 1966, National PTA registered the terms PTA and Parent-Teacher Association as service marks with the U.S. government.
 In 1970, the National Congress of Parents and Teachers (National PTA) and the National Congress of Colored Parents and Teachers (NCCPT)—founded by Selena Sloan Butler in Atlanta, Ga.—merged to serve all children.

Advocacy
From an annual gathering of delegates determined to serve the nation's children through an enlightened approach to education, home, environment, health and safety the National Congress of Mothers, now National Parent Teacher Association fanned out into a grassroots organization that took hold on the state and local levels as well as nationally. There were pamphlets written and distributed advising on how to organize "parents' auxiliaries" in the public schools and offering suggestions on the best ways to form and meet, and collections of loaned materials on child-development and parenting skills were made available to parents.

The role of PTA has always been to advocate for improvements in the lives of children and youth. The PTA's strength has helped institute countless positive changes, from the institution of school lunch and inoculation programs to the institution of child labor laws to the promotion of transportation safety, sex education, tobacco and alcohol education, and more. Even today, PTA is actively involved in working toward common goals, fighting for increased federal education funding and against school vouchers.

National PTA's Annual Public Policy
National PTA's annual public policy agenda outlines policy priorities and recommendations for Congress. The priorities are selected based on the timeliness of issue, opportunities for National PTA to provide leadership and expertise to Congress, alignment to National PTA's mission and resolution and ability to achieve a meaningful policy change that will produce positive results for children and their families.
 Creation of Kindergarten classes
 Child labor laws
 Public health service
 Hot and healthy lunch programs
 Juvenile justice system
 Mandatory immunization 
 Arts in Education
 School Safety
 Special Education
 Education Funding
 Early Childhood Education
 Elementary and Secondary Education
 Child nutrition

Our Children magazine
The first issue of National Parent Teacher Association's Our Children magazine – then named The National Congress of Mothers Magazine – was printed in November 1906. The purpose of the magazine was to give voice to National PTA's ambitions and to spread the word of its work and mission.

The magazine's title was changed in December 1909 to Child Welfare, when its focus was solely on the organization's main concern. By the 1930s, the sophistication of the magazine grew tremendously as it then featured in-depth articles by leading experts in fields such as education, health and child welfare. These works were illustrated by bountiful photos and lively pen-and-ink illustrations. Starting in September 1934, the magazine received another makeover where it was published in an oversized format and renamed as the National Parent-Teacher, "to more definitely associate the publication with the parent-teacher movement."

More changes came in 1961 with another new name—The PTA Magazine—under the editorial leadership of Eva Grant. She led the magazine to its period of widest influence and greatest circulation from 1939 to 1972. During that time, the magazine featured prominent regular contributors such as J. Edgar Hoover and Margaret Mead, and offered more information for parents than ever before.

In 1975, The PTA Magazine was replaced by PTA Today, a more modest publication that evolved out of the former National PTA Bulletin and appeared in tabloid form during its first three years. Eventually, PTA Today returned to a typical magazine format that was circulated mostly to local PTA units and kept them abreast of National PTA events and programs and provided useful parenting information.

The final major makeover took place in September 1995 when it was made more colorful and became Our Children in line with the founders' theme of the first convention that "All Children Are Our Children." In recent years, Our Children was published bi-monthly, five times per year and distributed to local and state PTA presidents, state PTA board members, state office personnel and a limited number of paid subscribers.

In fall 2015, Our Children was moved to a digital online format geared towards parents. It is now a monthly online publication, with one print edition distribution in the spring.

Parent teacher organization
A parent teacher organization (PTO) is a formal organization that consists of parents, teachers and school staff. The organization's goals may vary from organization to organization, but essentially the goals include volunteerism of parents, encouragement of teachers and students, community involvement, and welfare of students and families. It is not affiliated with the national Parent-Teacher Association (PTA) or Parent-Teacher-Student Association (PTSA). The PTA is a national association of millions of members and thousands of local units that provides leadership training and staff support.

Goals and/or mission statement 

Individual organizations typically establish goals and/or a mission statement. Here is a sample PTO Mission Statement from the New Franklin School PTO:

PTO board 
A PTO generally consists of a board. These members may include a president, vice president, secretary and treasurer. They may also include various specialty positions, such as hospitality or programs. The board typically governs the PTO by creating and voting on meeting dates, general meeting programs, etc.

PTO versus PTA 
A PTO is not the same as a parent-teacher association (PTA). They are similar in that both promote parent participation, but PTA takes a more active role in developing programs, advocacy and training. PTA operates at the school building, district, state and national levels and works on policy to better support children. Local PTA units set their own goals and missions, but they also join together to advocate and partner as a larger group. PTA is membership based and uses money from dues to offer staff support and grants, and to develop national programs, such as their Reflections arts in education program and their Standards for Family-School Partnerships implementation guide. A PTO is unaffiliated, local and does not pay dues to a national umbrella organization.

Activities 
PTO's encourage parent, teacher and community involvement by providing programs that facilitate so these activities may include bicycle safety, drug awareness, energy conservation, reading programs, science programs, math programs and pedestrian safety.

PTO parents get involved by supporting their students, teachers and staff. Parents can volunteer to be room parents to assist with class parties or field trips. They can help set up at a carnival or health fair. They can help teachers and staff by making copies for the class.

Teachers and staff may become involved by helping to plan events that encourage the education of the students. These may include workshops, tutoring or special family nights (math, science, reading).

The students reap the benefits by the involvement and support of all the adults involved in the PTO. The PTO supports the educational goals of the school, thus extending those goals to the students.

Notable members
 Kate M. Ainey, member
 C. Louise Boehringer, president Arizona chapter
 Leah Belle Kepner Boyce, Corresponding secretary of the California Parent-Teacher Association
 Laura Chenoweth Butz, well known as lecturer
 Javiera Caballero, President of the PTA at Club Boulevard Magnet Elementary in Durham, North Carolina
 Saidie Orr Dunbar, Member
 Thora B. Gardiner, Member
 Cora Bussey Hillis, early member and president of the Iowa chapter
 Mary Hughes, Active
 Kate Wetzel Jameson, Member
 Nannie S. Brown Kramer, active in club and civic affairs and very much interested in P. T. A. work'; held several important offices in P. T. A. organizations, including vice-president, California Congress of P. T. A. and chairman of several committees, serving her second term as a member of the Oakland Board of Education
 Laura Adrienne MacDonald, president of Tonopah Parent-Teacher Association
 Jane Brunson Marks, served on board of H. S. Parent-Teacher Association for several years
 Sara E. Morse, Member
 Vesta C. Muehleisen, held several executive offices in the Congress of PTA and taught a Summer Session Course on the P.T. movement in the San Diego State College
 Mary Elizabeth Parsons, gave programs of own music and talks
 Beatrice A. Pedersen, secretary of Parent-Teacher Association
 Ada E. Purpus, President of the Parent-Teacher Association at the John Muir Junior High School
 Violet Richardson Ward, president of the local chapter
 Miriam Van Waters, active
 Vivian L. Stephens, Grand Duchess of Parent-Teacher Association

See also 
 Parents and citizens (Australia)
 National Policy on Education, 1986
 Sarva Shiksha Abhiyan
 Rashtriya Madhyamik Shiksha Abhiyan

References

External links
  United Kingdom, PARENTKIND registered charity number 1072833
  United States National Parent Teacher Association

Civic and political organizations of the United States
Educational organizations based in the United States
1897 establishments in Washington, D.C.